In the 1998 2. divisjon, the third highest football league for men in Norway, 22 games were played in 8 groups, with 3 points given for wins and 1 for draws. Liv/Fossekallen, Skjetten, Clausenengen and Lofoten were promoted to the First Division through playoffs against the other 4 group winners. Number twelve, thirteen and fourteen were relegated to the 3. divisjon. The winning teams from each of the 19 groups in the 3. divisjon, plus some number-two teams, were promoted to the 2. divisjon.

League tables

Group 1

Group 2

Group 3

Group 4

Group 5

Group 6

Group 7

Group 8

Promotion playoffs

References

Norwegian Second Division seasons
3
Norway
Norway